Szekszárd (formerly also Szegzárd; ;  or) is a small city in southern Hungary and the capital of Tolna County. By population, Szekszárd is the smallest county capital in Hungary; by area, it is the second-smallest (after Tatabánya).

Location
Szekszárd lies at the meeting point of the Transdanubian Hills and the Great Hungarian Plain, at the mouth of Sió into the flood plain of Danube.

Etymology 
The Etymological Dictionary of Geographical Names, somewhat differently from the above, derives the name of the locality from the old Hungarian colour name szegszár (sötétsárga, brownish yellow), which could have become a personal name with the diminutive -d and thus could have been a predecessor of the town name.

History

Szekszárd was first mentioned in 1015. The Benedictine monastery of the town was founded by King Béla I in 1061.

During the reign of King Matthias, Szekszárd was the estate of Bishop John, who was involved in a conspiracy against the king. Because of this, King Matthias ordered the castle of Szekszárd to be demolished.

In 1485, Szekszárd was already a significant town, holding five market days a year, but during the Turkish ascendancy of Hungary, the town became deserted and the monastery was destroyed.

By the 18th century, Szekszárd was again a significant town, it became a county seat (of Tolna), and got a coat of arms. The town was destroyed by a fire in 1794, but it could not stop the town's development. Most of the important buildings—including the town hall, the County Hall and several churches—were built during the 19th century. By this time, Szekszárd already had 14,000 residents.

Mihály Babits, an important Hungarian poet was born in Szekszárd in 1883.

During World War II, Szekszárd was captured by Soviet troops of the 3rd Ukrainian Front on 30 November 1944 as part of the Budapest Offensive.

In 1994, Szekszárd was granted the rank of city with county rights, in accordance with a new law stating that all county seats are cities with county rights. (Previously only cities with a population over 50,000 were granted county rights, and Szekszárd was one of only two county seats that had a smaller population than 50,000; the other was Salgótarján).

Transportation
Szekszárd lies on a railway line Rétszilas - Bátaszék and on a junction of main roads No. 6, 56, 63 and 65. Motorways M6 and M9  cross each other near the city. There also are local bus lines for city transportation operated by DDKK.

Main sights
 Old county hall (neo-Classical style)
 Augusz manor (Franz Liszt was a guest here)
 Deutsche Bühne Ungarn
 Birthplace of Mihály Babits, Museums
 Birthplace of Valéria Dienes
 Ruins of Benedictine monastery
 János Garay Square and statue

Twin towns – sister cities

Szekszárd is twinned with:

 Bečej, Serbia (1975)
 Bezons, France (1967)
 Bietigheim-Bissingen, Germany (1989)
 Făget, Romania (1998)
 Jajce, Bosnia and Herzegovina (2016)
 Lugoj, Romania (1993)
 Province of Ravenna, Italy (1996)
 Tornio, Finland (1986)
 Waregem, Belgium (1993)

Notable people
Károly Escher, photographer
Mihály Babits, poet
János Garay, poet
Attila Fiola, footballer
János Hahn, footballer

Sport

The women's basketball team Atomerőmű Szekszárd play in the Nemzeti Bajnokság is the premier tier of Hungarian basketball. Szekszárdi UFC play in the Nemzeti Bajnokság III, the third tier of Hungarian football.

See also
 Gemenc forest

References

External links

  in Hungarian, English and German
 Aerial photography: Szekszárd

County seats in Hungary
Cities with county rights of Hungary
Populated places in Tolna County
Wine regions of Hungary